Dunraven Peak el.  is a mountain peak in the Washburn Range of Yellowstone National Park. In 1874, just two years after the park's creation, The 4th Earl of Dunraven and Mount-Earl, an Anglo-Irish peer, made a visit to Yellowstone in conjunction with a hunting expedition led by Texas Jack Omohundro to the Northern Rockies. Lord Dunraven was so impressed with the park, that he devoted well over 150 pages to Yellowstone in his The Great Divide, published in London in 1874.  The Great Divide was one of the earliest works to praise and publicize the park.

In 1878, during a U.S. Geological Survey of the park, Henry Gannett, a geographer working with the survey, named a peak just two miles southwest of Mount Washburn in honor of Lord Dunraven and the service his book had done for the park.  In 1879, Philetus Norris, the park Superintendent, gave a pass on the Grand Loop Road between Tower and Canyon the name Dunraven Pass because of its proximity to Dunraven Peak.

See also
Mountains and mountain ranges of Yellowstone National Park

Notes

Mountains of Wyoming
Mountains of Yellowstone National Park
Mountains of Park County, Wyoming